The Decca Years may refer to:

The Decca Years (The Kingston Trio album)
The Decca Years (Kaipa album)